The 2002–03 Holy Cross Crusaders men's basketball team represented the College of the Holy Cross during the 2002–03 NCAA Division I men's basketball season. The Crusaders, led by 4th-year head coach Ralph Willard, played their home games at the Hart Center and were members of the Patriot League. They finished the season 26–5, 13–1 in Patriot League play to win the regular season league title. As the #1 seed, they defeated Army, Bucknell, and American to be champions of the Patriot League tournament and earn the conference's automatic bid to the NCAA tournament. Playing as the No. 14 seed in the Midwest region, they were beaten by No. 3 seed and eventual Final Four participant Marquette, 72–68.

Roster

Schedule and results

|-
!colspan=9 style=|Non-conference regular season

|-
!colspan=9 style=|Patriot League regular season

|-
!colspan=9 style=| Patriot League Tournament

|-
!colspan=9 style=|NCAA Tournament

References

Holy Cross Crusaders men's basketball seasons
Holy Cross
Holy Cross Crusaders men's basketball
Holy Cross Crusaders men's basketball
Holy Cross